Hajjah is a Palestinian village in the northern West Bank, located eighteen kilometers west of Nablus in the Qalqilya Governorate of the State of Palestine. According to the Palestinian Central Bureau of Statistics, the town had a population of approximately 2,500 inhabitants in mid-year 2006.

Location
It is bordered by Kafr Qaddum and Immatin to the east, Al Funduq and Jinsafut to the south, Kafr ‘Abbush, Kafr Laqif and Baqat al Hatab to the west, and Kur to the north.

Etymology 
According to the local inhabitants, Hajjah is originally an Aramaic word translated as "market" or "society".

History
Potsherds from the Israelite, Byzantine and Early Muslim periods have been found at Hajja.

Ancient period 
The earliest potsherds indicate that Hajja was already inhabited during the Iron Age, probably by the Tribe of Menashe.

Roman and Byzantine periods 
Hajja has been identified with Kfar Hagai, an ancient Samaritan village that had existed since at least the mid-Second Temple Period. A votive inscription of the third or second century BCE from Mount Gerizim, the holiest site in Samaritanism and then the site of a major temple, reads "That which Ḥaggai son of Qimi from Kfar Ḥaggai offered".

In later Samaritan sources, this might be the village referred to as "Kiryat Hagga" or "Kirjath Hagah". It was mentioned as the birthplace of Baba Rabba, who is said to have built several synagogues in the area, including in the village of Hagga. The Tolidah, a Samaritan historical work, mentions a man named Gever Ben-Karmi of Kiryat Hagga.

Mikvahs found in the village along with four seven-branched menorahs inscribed on stone indicate that Hagga was still a Samaritan village during the Byzantine and Early Islamic periods.

Mamluk period 
During the reign of the Mamluk sultan An-Nasir Muhammad, in 722 AH/1322 CE, a mosque was constructed in the village. A minaret was added to it in 735 AH/1334-1335 CE. These building were done in the name of Muhammed bin Musa bin Ahmed, a local imam, whose grave stone is also by the mosque, dating his death to 749 AH/1348 CE.

Ottoman era
Hajja was incorporated into the Ottoman Empire in 1517 with all of Palestine, and in 1596 it appeared in the tax registers as being in the Nahiya of Bani Sa'b of the Liwa of Nablus. It had a population of 96 households, all Muslims. The villagers paid a fixed tax rate of 33.3% on various agricultural products, such as  wheat, barley, summer crops, olive trees, goats and/or beehives, in addition to "occasional revenues", a press for olive oil or grape syrup, and a tax for people of the Nablus region; a total of 19,200 akçe. All of the revenues went to a waqf.

In 1838, Robinson noted Kuryet Hajja as a village in Beni Sa'ab district, west of Nablus, while in 1870 Victor Guérin noted it from Fara'ata.

In 1882 the PEF's Survey of Western Palestine (SWP) noted about Kuryet Hajja: "A good-sized village on high ground, supplied by wells. It has a rock-cut tomb on the west, and appears to be an ancient place."

British Mandate era
In the 1922 census of Palestine conducted by the British Mandate authorities, Qariyet Hajjeh had a population of 642 inhabitants, all  Muslims, increasing in the 1931 census to 731 Muslims, with 206  houses.

In the 1945 statistics the population was 960 Muslims, with 13,119 dunams of land, according to an official land and population survey. Of this, 4 dunams were for citrus and bananas, 1,226 dunams were for plantations or irrigated land, 5,045 were for cereals, while 36 dunams were built-up land.

Jordanian era
In the wake of the 1948 Arab–Israeli War, and after the 1949 Armistice Agreements, Hajjah came  under Jordanian rule.

The Jordanian census of 1961 found 1,093 inhabitants.

1967-present
Since the Six-Day War in 1967, Hajjah has been under Israeli occupation.

After the 1995 accords, 37.2% of village land was assigned as Area B land, while the remaining 62.8% is assigned Area C.

Israel has confiscated 216 dunums of land from Hajja to establish two Israeli settlements, Karne Shomron and Neve Oramin, with the remainder of the land for these two settlements taken from Jinsafut, Kafr Laqif and Deir Istiya). Israel has also confiscated land from Hajja to build bypass roads and the Israeli West Bank barrier.

Demographics 
The current residents of Hajjah trace their ancestry to Egypt, Yemen and Jaffa. They are united in several clans ("hamulas"), including the Bata-Hamed, Masalha, Da'as, Ta'ayun and Farhat clans, among others. Other families in the village are believed by locals to be the descendants of Samaritan families which had lived in the village until the Middle Ages, when they converted to Islam. Some of them, who trace their ancestry to the Samaritan Zipor HaMatari family, still live in the village as the "Al-Tzipi" clan.

Notable people
 Mahmoud Da'as

References

Bibliography

External links
Welcome to Hajja
 Hajjah, Welcome to Palestine
Survey of Western Palestine, Map 11:    IAA, Wikimedia commons
Hajja village (fact sheet),  Applied Research Institute–Jerusalem (ARIJ)
Hajja village profile, ARIJ
Hajja, aerial photo, ARIJ
Development Priorities and Needs in Hajja, ARIJ

Villages in the West Bank
Qalqilya Governorate
Municipalities of the State of Palestine
ancient Samaritan settlements